The 2015 Open du Pays d'Aix was a professional tennis tournament played on clay courts. It was the second edition of the tournament which was part of the 2015 ATP Challenger Tour. It took place in Aix-en-Provence, France between 4 and 10 May 2015.

Singles main-draw entrants

Seeds

 1 Rankings are as of April 28, 2015.

Other entrants
The following players received wildcards into the singles main draw:
  Quentin Halys
  Constant Lestienne
  Florian Mayer
  Lucas Pouille

The following players received entry as a special exempt to gain entry into the main draw:
  Iñigo Cervantes Huegun
  Maxime Hamou

The following players received entry from the qualifying draw:
  Yann Marti
  Jonathan Eysseric
  Laurent Rochette
  José Pereira

The following players received entry from as lucky losers:
  Andriej Kapaś
  Antoine Escoffier

Doubles main-draw entrants

Seeds

1 Rankings as of April 28, 2015.

Other entrants 
The following pairs received wildcards into the doubles main draw:
  Maxime Chazal /  Constant Lestienne
  Mathias Bourgue /  David Guez

Champions

Singles

 Robin Haase def.  Paul-Henri Mathieu 7–6 (7–1), 6–2

Doubles

  Robin Haase /  Aisam-ul-Haq Qureshi def.  Nicholas Monroe /  Artem Sitak 6–1, 6–2

External links
Official Website

Open du Pays d'Aix
Open du Pays d'Aix
Open